Nikolay Shirshov (22 June 1974 – 28 December 2021) was an Uzbekistani professional footballer who played as a midfielder.

Career
Shirshov began his player career in 1991 in Sverdlovets, club from Soviet Second League. From 1992 to 1999 he played in Uzbek League clubs Traktor Tashkent and Pakhtakor. Since 2000 he played in Russian football clubs.

He got 63 caps and 13 goals for the Uzbekistan national team between 1996 and 2005.

Personal life and death
Shirshov died on 28 December 2021, at the age of 47. The cause of death was not specified.

References

External links
Nikolay Shirshov at playerhistory.com

1974 births
2021 deaths
Sportspeople from Tashkent
Soviet footballers
Uzbekistani footballers
Association football defenders
Uzbekistan international footballers
1996 AFC Asian Cup players
2000 AFC Asian Cup players
2004 AFC Asian Cup players
Traktor Tashkent players
Pakhtakor Tashkent FK players
FC Ordabasy players
FC Rostov players
FC SKA Rostov-on-Don players
FC Taganrog players
Russian Premier League players
Uzbekistani people of Russian descent
Footballers at the 1998 Asian Games
Asian Games competitors for Uzbekistan
Uzbekistani expatriate footballers
Uzbekistani expatriate sportspeople in Russia
Expatriate footballers in Russia
Uzbekistani expatriate sportspeople in Kazakhstan
Expatriate footballers in Kazakhstan